This is a list of restaurants in Israel. In 2007 there were about 4,400 food and beverage vendors in Israel. By 2012 about 8000 such business were reported. With the highest percentage of vegans, Israel has many vegan restaurants. Israel's main American fast food chains include: McDonald's, Burger King, Domino's Pizza, Pizza Hut, Papa John's Pizza, The Cheesecake Factory and KFC (opens its first location in Israel in March 2019).

Restaurant chains

Israeli international chains 
 Aroma Espresso Bar – espresso and coffee chain with 162 branches in Israel and branches in the United States, Canada, Kazakhstan, Romania, and Ukraine. 
 Cofix – Israeli coffee house chain selling most items for NIS 5 with locations dispersed over Israel and Russia
 Max Brenner – Israeli chocolate shop and restaurant with 36 branches in Australia, Israel, Japan, Russia, and the US

Foreign chains operating in Israel 

 Burger King – operating 12 locations in 2023, out of 19,000 worldwide
 Domino's Pizza – operating 57 locations around Israel out of 16,000 worldwide
 KFC – operates 16 branches in Israel out of 24,000 worldwide
 McDonald's – 225 locations out of about 40,000 locations worldwide
 Papa John's Pizza – operates 25 locations around Israel, out of 5,000 locations worldwide
 Pizza Hut – operating 43 locations around Israel out of 19,000 locations worldwide

National chains

 Arcaffe – is a chain of cafes in Israel with 29 outlets across the country
 Big Apple Pizza –  New York City-style pizza chain with 10 locations around Israel
 Black Bar 'n' Burger – burger chain with 14 locations across Israel
 Burgeranch – fast-food chain with 107 restaurants and over 1500 employees in 2010
 Burgers Bar – sit-down, American-style bar restaurant with 30 locations across Israel
 Café Café – Israeli coffee chain with about 65 locations. Went international for a while.
 Holy Bagel – bagel store chain with 11 locations around Israel
 Roladin – largest bakery chain in Israel, with 43 locations around Israel

Regional, local, and small chains 
 Abu Hassan – Hummus restaurant with 3 locations in Jaffa
 Beit Haful – a chain of 9 Mediterranean restaurants in Southern Israel
 Café Rimon – a chain of 2 locations in Jerusalem and 1 in Beit Shemesh
 HaShamen – Shawarma chain with 7 locations around Israel
 Mike's Place – American-style bar with 3 locations around Israel
 Papagaio – churrascaria-style restaurant with 2 locations around Israel

International chains that failed in Israel 
 The Cheesecake Factory – operated 8 locations around Israel until 2020. The Rishon store continues as The Factory.
 Dunkin' Donuts – At one time operated 9 branches in Israel, then folded.
 Sbarro – entered Israel in 1995 and had 25 branches at the height of its success.
 Starbucks – had 20 locations in the greater Tel Aviv region. Pulled out for lack of profitability.
 Subway – had 23 locations around Israel. Closed in 2004.
 Wendy's – operated a few years from 1987, had just a few branches.
 Wimpy – entered in the 1960s, folded in the 1980s.

Restaurants

Haifa & North 
 Diana restaurant, oldest surviving restaurant in Nazareth. Was a chain for a while. 
 Falafel HaZkenim, Haifa – famous Israeli falafel restaurant. Briefly had a branch.
 MacDavid – started as a hamburger restaurant in Tel Aviv, grew to 28 branches nationwide, now one restaurant in Haifa.
 HaOgen, Haifa – founded 1942, this is Israel's oldest pub if not its oldest restaurant
 Yonk – Romanian grill since 1948 in Haifa

Tel Aviv & Center 
 Blue Sky by Meir Adoni – fine dining at the Carlton Tel Aviv
 Lumina by Meir Adoni – fine dining at the Carlton Tel Aviv
 Mashya – fine dining in Tel Aviv
 Pastel – fine dining at the Tel Aviv Museum of Art
 Herbert Samuel. Kosher fine-dining in Herzliya. Was an Israeli chain of 3 restaurants.  
 Spaghettim – Italian cuisine in Petach Tikva. Was a chain with 17 restaurants nationwide in 2010.

Jerusalem & South 

 Anna Italian Café – located in the Ticho House, a historic home in Jerusalem that is a branch of the Israel Museum.
 Barood – bar-restaurant in Jerusalem serving Sephardic cuisine
 The Eucalyptus – kosher meat restaurant in Jerusalem
 La Régence – fine dining at the King David Hotel in Jerusalem
 Sami VeSusu – Romanian cuisine restaurant at the municipal market of Beersheba

Former

 Café Hillel – cafe, espresso bar, and sandwich bar chain that closed down in 2003
 Mișu King of the Kebab - Romanian cuisine in Jaffa.
 Mul Yam – restaurant located in Tel Aviv Port, founded in 1995; burned down in 2015
 Nizahon Restaurant –  Romanian grill in Ashkelon, founded in 1949, closed in 2019
 Penguin – family restaurant from 1940 to 2022 in Nahariya

See also

 Israeli cuisine
 Kosher restaurant
 List of companies of Israel
 List of kosher restaurants
 Lists of restaurants

References

External links
 

 
Lists of companies of Israel
Israel